Japanese design law is determined by the . Under this Act, only registered designs are legally protected, and it stipulates the procedure for obtaining a design registration in the Japan Patent Office. The Act amended in 2019 to expand its scope of protections of graphic images and interior and exterior designs of the architectures, to extend the protection term to 25 years from the filing date, and to accept multiple designs filings.

Definitions 
A design is defined as the following subject matters "which creates an aesthetic impression through the eye";

 the shape, patterns or colors, or any combination thereof, of an article (including a part of an article),
 the shape of an architectural structure (including a part of an architectural structure), or 
 the graphic image, which is provided for use in the operation of the article or is displayed as a result of performance of the article.  

Designs may be subjected to the protection if:

 they are novel, that is if no identical design has been made available to the public before the filing date, and
 they are not easily created on the basis of publicly known designs or motifs.

English translation 
An official English-language translation of the law does not exist, but the Japanese Ministry of Justice's website, under the Japanese Law Translation section provides users with Japanese laws and their unofficial English translation. IP laws such as the Patent Act, Copyright Act, Trademark Act, Design Act and the Unfair Competition Prevention Act are included there.

In addition, the J-PlatPat offers the public access to IP Gazettes of the Japan Patent Office (JPO) free of charge through the internet.

Reliable information on Japanese IP law in English is also provided by the websites of the Intellectual Property High Court, Japan Patent Office, Transparency of Japanese Law Project, European Patent Office, and the Institute of Intellectual Property (IIP) of Japan.

See also 
 Japanese patent law
 Japanese copyright law
 Japanese trademark law
 Japanese law

References

External links 
 Japanese Law Translation - The website of the Ministry of Justice Japan, in which you can search for Japanese laws and their English translation. Intellectual Property laws such as Patent Act, Copyright Act, Trademark Act, Design Act, Unfair Competition Prevention Act, etc. are included.
 Intellectual Property High Court
 Jurisdiction
 Statistics
 Summary of Cases - You can search for English summaries of IP cases in all the instances.
 Publications - Presentation and theses on IP in English by Japanese judges.
 Japan Patent Office - Handling not only patent and utility models but also designs and trademarks. The website contains the information on procedures for obtaining those IP rights.
 JPlatPat - Offering the public access to IP Gazettes of the Japan Patent Office (JPO) free of charge.
 Japanese Copyright Law and Japanese Patent Law - As part of the Transparency of Japanese Law Project, provides overviews and explanations of Japanese copyrights and patents. The website also contains information on corporate law, contract law, finance law, insolvency law, arbitration law and civil litigation law in Japan.
 Institute of Intellectual Property (IIP) of Japan
 Translated Books  - Free access to English-translated Japanese literature regarding Japanese Patent Law and Trademark Law.
 Patent information from Japan - On the European Patent Office web site.

Japanese intellectual property law
Industrial design